Paraguay Marathon Club initialed PMC is a track and field athletics club based in the city of Asunción in Paraguay. The club is affiliated with the Federación Paraguaya de Atletismo. The current president of the Paraguay Marathon Club is Myrta Doldán, who is also president of the Federación Paraguaya de Atletismo. At national level, Paraguay Marathon Club is the best athletics club in Paraguay along with Club Sol de América and the Asociación de Atletismo del Alto Paraná.

History
Paraguay Marathon Club was champion of the 2014 Paraguayan Athletics Championships upon reaching 345 points.

Paraguay Marathon Club was crowned champion of the 2015 Paraguayan Athletics Championships, where it achieved a score of 139.

Athletes

International

National

See also
 List of athletics clubs in Paraguay
 List of Paraguayan records in athletics

References

External links
 Paraguay Marathon Club Official Website
 Official Facebook Page

Athletics clubs in Paraguay
Sport in Asunción